Heterocampa incongrua is a species of moth in the family Notodontidae (the prominents). It was first described by William Barnes and Foster Hendrickson Benjamin in 1924 and it is found in North America.

The MONA or Hodges number for Heterocampa incongrua is 7989.

References

Further reading

 
 
 

Notodontidae
Articles created by Qbugbot
Moths described in 1924